The Exeter Book, also known as the Codex Exoniensis or Exeter Cathedral Library MS 3501, is a large codex of Old English poetry, believed to have been produced in the late tenth century AD. It is one of the four major manuscripts of Old English poetry, along with the Vercelli Book in Vercelli, Italy, the Nowell Codex in the British Library, and the Junius manuscript in the Bodleian Library in Oxford. The book was donated to what is now the Exeter Cathedral library by Leofric, the first bishop of Exeter, in 1072. It is believed originally to have contained 130 or 131 leaves, of which the first 7 or 8 have been replaced with other leaves; the original first 8 leaves are lost. The Exeter Book is the largest and perhaps oldest known manuscript of Old English literature, containing about a sixth of the Old English poetry that has come down to us.

In 2016, UNESCO recognized the book as "the foundation volume of English literature, one of the world's principal cultural artefacts".

History
The Exeter Book is generally acknowledged to be one of the great works of the English Benedictine revival of the tenth century; the precise dates that it was written and compiled are unknown, although proposed dates range from 960 to 990. This period saw a rise in monastic activity and productivity under the renewed influence of Benedictine principles and standards.  At the opening of the period, Dunstan's importance to the Church and to the English kingdom was established, culminating in his appointment to the Archbishopric at Canterbury under Edgar of England and leading to the monastic reformation by which this era was characterised. Dunstan died in 998, and by the period's close, England under Æthelred faced an increasingly determined Scandinavian incursion, to which it would eventually succumb.

The Exeter Book's heritage becomes traceable from the death of Leofric, bishop of Exeter, in 1072. Among the possessions which he bequeathed in his will to the then-impoverished monastery at Exeter (the precursor to the later cathedral) is one famously described as i mycel Englisc boc be gehwilcum þingum on leoð-wisan geworht: "one large English book on various subjects, composed in verse form". This book has been widely identified by scholars as the Exeter Codex.

Leofric's bequest, however, took place at least three generations after the book was written, and it has generally been assumed that it originated elsewhere. According to Patrick Conner, the original scribe who wrote the text probably did not write it as a single volume, but rather three separate manuscript booklets which were later compiled into the Exeter Book codex. There are a number of missing gatherings and pages. Some marginalia were added to the manuscript by the antiquarians Laurence Nowell in the sixteenth century and George Hickes in the seventeenth.

Contents
Aside from eight leaves added to the codex after it was written, the Exeter Book consists entirely of poetry. However, unlike the Junius manuscript, which is dedicated to biblically inspired works, the Exeter Book is noted for the unmatched diversity of genres among its contents, as well as their generally high level of poetic quality.

The poems give a sense of the intellectual sophistication of Anglo-Saxon literary culture. They include numerous saints’ lives, gnomic verses, and wisdom poems, in addition to almost a hundred riddles, numerous smaller heroic poems, and a quantity of elegiac verse. The moving elegies and enigmatic riddles are the most famous of the Exeter Book texts. The elegies primarily explore the themes of alienation, loss, the passage of time, desolation, and death, and deal with subjects including the sorrows of exile, the ruination of the past, and the long separation of lovers. Through them we encounter lonely seafarers, banished wanderers, and mournful lovers. The riddles, by contrast, explore the fabric of the world through the prism of the everyday. (See the sections on 'Riddles' and 'Elegies' below.) The Exeter manuscript is also important because it contains two poems signed by the poet Cynewulf, who is one of only twelve Old English poets known to us by name.

According to the Encyclopædia Britannica, "the arrangement of the poems appears to be haphazard, and the book is believed to be copied from an earlier collection". However, whether (or the extent to which) the Exeter Book is a deliberately crafted anthology of related poems or a miscellany of unrelated poems is a matter of debate, as some degree of order has been found in the organisation of its contents.

None of the poems is given a title in the manuscript, and there is often no obvious indicator of where one text ends and the next begins, other than a plain initial. Consequently, the titles given to the poems in the Exeter Book are those that editors have established over the years, and very often a given poem will be known by several titles. The following is one listing of poems found in the book (titles may vary depending on source):

Christ I, II, III
Guthlac A and B
Azarias
The Phoenix
Juliana
The Wanderer
The Gifts of Men
Precepts
The Seafarer
Vainglory
Widsith
The Fortunes of Men
Maxims I
The Order of the World
The Rhyming Poem
The Panther
The Whale
The Partridge
Soul and Body II
Deor
Wulf and Eadwacer
Riddles 1-57/59
The Wife's Lament
The Judgment Day I
Resignation
The Descent into Hell
Alms-Giving
Pharaoh
The Lord’s Prayer I
Homiletic Fragment II
Riddle 28b / 30b
Riddle 58 / 60
The Husband's Message
The Ruin
Riddles 59-91 / 61-95

Riddles

Among the other texts in the Exeter Book, there are over ninety riddles, written in the conventional alliterative style of Old English poetry. Their topics, which range from the religious to the mundane, are represented in an oblique and elliptical manner, challenging the reader to deduce what they are about. Some of the riddles are double entendres, setting out entirely innocent subject matter in language filled with bawdy connotations, such as Riddle 25 below.

Two Exeter Book riddles are presented below, with Modern English translations alongside the Old English originals. Proposed answers to the riddles are included below the text.

Riddle 25 

Answer: an onion

Riddle 26 

Answer: a Bible

Elegies 

The Exeter Book contains the Old English poems known as the "elegies": "The Wanderer" (fol. 76b - fol. 78a); "The Seafarer" (fol. 81b - fol. 83a); "The Riming Poem" fol. 94a - fol. 95b); "Deor" (fol. 100a - fol. 100b), "Wulf and Eadwacer" (fol. 100b - fol. 101a); "The Wife's Lament" (fol. 115a - fol. 115b); "The Husband's Message" (fol. 123a - 123b); and "The Ruin" (fol. 123b - fol. 124b).

The term "elegy" can be confusing due to its application to a diverse range of poems and poetic genres from different cultures and time periods. For example, the Oxford English Dictionary defines elegy (in the poetic sense) as a poem either composed in the elegiac metre of Greek and Roman lyric poets, expressing "personal sentiments on a range of subjects, including epigrams, laments, [and] love", or "a poem in another language based on or influenced by this" – hence, from this latter definition, the application of the term "elegy" to the Old English poems, which are not elegiac in their metre. More broadly, the term "elegy" has also been widened by some to include "any serious meditative poem", a definition which would include the Exeter Book elegies. Providing a synthesis of the strictly metrical definition and the broader definition based on subject matter, Anne Klinck argues in The Old English Elegies that "genre should be conceived [...] as a grouping of literary works based, theoretically, upon both outer form (specific meter or structure) and also upon inner form (attitude, tone, purpose – more crudely, subject and audience)".

Editions and translations 
Included here are facsimiles, editions, and translations that include a significant proportion of texts from the Exeter Book.

Facsimiles 

Online facsimile

Editions: Old English text only

Editions: Old English text and translation 

 Anthology of Old English poetry, featuring many of the texts from the Exeter Book.
Gollancz, Israel (1894). The Exeter book. Early English Text Society, Original series, Volume 104, 194.
 Foys, Martin et al. (ed.) (2019) Old English Poetry in Facsimile Project, Madison: Center for the History of Print and Digital Culture, University of Wisconsin-Madison; edition with digital images of poems' manuscript pages, and translations.

Editions: Translations only
 Anthology of Old English poetry and prose, featuring poems from the Exeter Book.

 Contains riddles only.
Williamson, Craig, (2017) The Complete Old English Poems. University of Pennsylvania Press. .

See also
Anglo-Saxon literature
Old English language

References

Bibliography

External links
The Exeter Book — digitisation
The Exeter Book — transcription
James Grout: Exeter Book of Riddles, part of the Encyclopædia Romana

10th-century books
Old English poetry
History of Exeter
Riddles
Exeter Cathedral Library collection
English manuscripts